A Slow Night at the Kuwaiti Cafe is a 1992 Australian film directed by Marc Gracie. It was not theatrically released.

Premise
A Vietnam veteran takes over the small Kuwaiti Cafe in downtown Melbourne and holds the manager hostage in a countdown to prevent the Gulf War.

References

External links

Australian crime drama films
1992 films
1990s English-language films
1990s Australian films